Ngaatjatjarra (also Ngaatjatjara, Ngaadadjarra) is an Australian Aboriginal dialect of the Western Desert language. It is spoken in the Western Desert cultural bloc which covers about 600 000 square kilometres of the arid central and central-western desert. It is very similar to its close neighbours Ngaanyatjarra, Pitjantjatjara and Pintupi, with which it is highly mutually intelligible.

Most Ngaatjatjarra   live in one of the communities of Warburton, Warakurna, Tjukurla or Docker River.

Origin of the name
The name Ngaatjatjarra derives from the word ngaatja 'this' which, combined with the comitative suffix -tjarra means something like ' ngaatja-having'. This distinguishes it from its near neighbour Ngaanyatjarra which has ngaanya for 'this'.

Sign language
The Ngaada have (or at one point had) a signed form of their language, though it is not clear from records that it was particularly well-developed compared to other Australian Aboriginal sign languages.

References

 DOUSSET Laurent 2002. Politics and demography in a contact situation: The establishment of Giles Meteorological Station in the Rawlinson Ranges, Aboriginal History, 26: 1-22.
 DOUSSET Laurent 2003. On the misinterpretation of the Aluridja kinship system type (Australian Western Desert), Social Anthropology, 11(1): 43-61.
 DOUSSET Laurent 2005. Structure and Substance: Combining ‘Classic’ and ‘Modern’ Kinship Studies in the Australian Western Desert, TAJA, 16(1): 18-30.
 DOUSSET L. 2003. Indigenous modes of representing social relationships: A short critique of the “genealogical concept”, Aboriginal Studies, 2003/1: 19-29.
 GLASS A. & HACKETT D. 2003. Ngaanyatjarra & Ngaatjatjarra to English dictionary. Alice Springs: IAD. 
 GOULD R.A. 1968. Living Archaeology: The Ngatatjara of Western Australia, Southwestern Journal of Anthropology, 24(2): 101-122.
 GOULD R.A. 1969. Subsistence behavior among the Western desert Aborigines of Australia, Oceania, 39(4): 253-274.

External links
 AusAnthrop database: Ngaatjatjarra
 Handbook of Western Aboriginal languages of the South Kimberley Region
 ELAR archive of Western Desert Special Speech Styles Project

Wati languages